Founded in 2014 by Ravy Truchot, FC Miami City (FCMC) is an American soccer club based in South Florida. The club is owned and operated by Strive Football Group, the leading private owner and operator of football clubs and academies.

The club consists of a men and women's team competing in the United Soccer League (USL), and the youth academies of Paris Saint-Germain in the U.S.

FC Miami City men and women's teams, as well as Paris Saint-Germain Academy USA teams, are deeply connected on and off the field. The club culture results in a strong positive environment, with a strong sense of community, which leads to players and staff collaborating to achieve the youth to professional path.

History 

Since 2014, FC Miami City is a fully affiliated member of the United Soccer League (USL), North America's largest professional soccer organization that oversees the USL Championship, USL League One, USL League Two, USL W, and USL Academy.

In 2021, FC Miami City joined the USL Academy where young players are provided opportunities to compete in a platform with professional standards to develop and gain experience to reach their club' USL first team and gain exposure needed to succeed at the next level.

At the start of 2022, FC Miami entered the USL W League, the nation's premier women's development league, as co-founder. Entering the league established the club's commitment to developing the next generation of young female talent by bringing elite women's soccer to South Florida.
For future generations of women soccer players, the league provides exposure opportunities both on and off the field, and strengthen the women's soccer pipeline between collegiate and professional soccer.

Philosophy 

The club prides itself in developing young players through professional European training regimens and intense competitions, guiding players progress through the ranks of youth to professional soccer and offering exposure opportunities to reach the professional world in the U.S. and Europe. 

FC Miami City provides professional on and off the field training, with a focus placed on dedication, competition, and leadership to develop player's skills, regardless of their background.

Ownership 

President
Ravy Truchot

Honorary president
Alain Truchot

Stadium 

The club plays its home games at the Paris Saint-Germain Academy USA Campus (Central Broward Park) in Lauderhill, Florida.

Colors 

The team's colors and logos include blue, white, and red.

Men's team

Current squad (USL 2)

Management team 
{|class="wikitable"
|-
!Position
!Staff
|-
|Head coach || Julian Pedraza
|-
|Physical therapist || Luis Rivera
|-

Year by year

Notable players 

Defenders: 
  Hugo Leroux
  Victor Nirennold
  Jonny Campbell
  Jonathan Parpeix
  Hervé Batoménila

Midfielders: 
  Marcel Mahouvé
  Sidney Govou
  Darren Ríos
  Bryan Arguez
  Patrick Lopez

Strikers: 
  David Santamaria

Women's team

Current squad (USL W)

Management team 
{|class="wikitable"
|-
!Position
!Staff
|-
|Head coach || Jon Colino
|-
|Assistant coach || Daniel Medina
|-
|Assistant coach || Gonzalo Rudolf
|-
|Physical therapist || Luis Rivera
|-

Year by year

References

External links 
 

Association football clubs established in 2014
Soccer clubs in Miami
USL League Two teams
Soccer clubs in Florida
2014 establishments in Florida
Soccer clubs in South Florida